The Alaskan Independence Party (AKIP) is an Alaskan nationalist political party that advocates an in-state referendum which would include the option of Alaska becoming an independent country.  The party also advocates positions similar to those of the Constitution Party, Republican Party and Libertarian Party, supporting gun rights, anti-abortion policies, privatization, home schooling, and limited government. Wally Hickel was elected Governor of Alaska in 1990 on the Independence Party ticket, making it one of the few third parties to have controlled a governor's seat; however, Hickel transferred to the Republican Party before the 1994 election.

History
The Alaskan Independence Party was founded with the goal of obtaining for Alaskans the right to vote on statehood. Referring to Alaska's 1959 admission to the union, the AKIP charter states: "The Alaskan Independence Party's goal is the vote we were entitled to in 1958, one choice from among the following four choices:
 Remain a territory.
 Become a separate and independent country.
 Accept commonwealth status.
 Become a state.

The call for this vote is in furtherance of the dream of the Alaskan Independence Party's founding father, Joe Vogler, which was for Alaskans to achieve independence under a minimal government, fully responsive to the people, promoting a peaceful and lawful means of resolving differences."

Since its founding, the AKIP has radically changed with respect to the issue of secession. At present, it does not support secession though, at its founding, it did. In 1973 Vogler began arguing about the validity of the Alaskan statehood vote. Early in that year, he began circulating a petition seeking support for secession of Alaska from the United States. Alaska magazine published a piece at that time in which Vogler claimed to have gathered 25,000 signatures in three weeks.

Vogler has been quoted as stating "I'm an Alaskan, not an American. I've got no use for America or her damned institutions."

In early 1973, Vogler founded Alaskans For Independence, originally to label the petition drive. The organization took on a life of its own in the following years, and actively pursued secession for Alaska from the United States. Vogler also founded the Alaskan Independence Party at around the same time. During its first decade of existence, the Party was used exclusively by Vogler for his first two campaigns for governor and campaign for lieutenant governor (with Don Wright as his running mate). Largely in response to the lawsuit Vogler v. Miller, the State of Alaska enacted emergency regulations, effective June 14, 1984, which gave official recognition to the party in Alaska. The party has maintained its recognized status since, first by maintaining thresholds in gubernatorial elections, then through same with voter registration. The AKIP, while a home to many secession-minded people, has from the start sought to explore whether the 1958 vote by Alaskans authorizing statehood was legal, as outlined in the excerpt from the party's charter found above.

Vogler would serve as the AKIP's standard-bearer for most of the party's first two decades. He ran for governor in 1974, with Wayne Peppler as his running mate. Jay Hammond was elected over incumbent governor William Egan, with Vogler trailing far behind. Typical political discussion of the day included the contention that Vogler was a "spoiler," and that the result would have been different had he not been in the race, however Vogler ran on a conservative platform and perhaps if he hadn't run the margin of victory would have been larger for Republican Hammond.

Vogler's running mate in 1986 was Al Rowe, a Fairbanks resident and former Alaska State Trooper. Rowe took out a series of newspaper ads, fashioning himself in the image of Sheriff Buford Pusser. These ads were a major attention getter during the race. Between Rowe's ads and the turmoil existing in the Republican Party over the nomination of Arliss Sturgulewski, the AKIP gained 5.2 percent of the vote, becoming a recognized party in Alaska for the first time.

Since then, AKIP candidates have disapproved of initiating a statewide vote revisiting the status of Alaskan statehood. In 1990, former Republican governor Walter Joseph Hickel won the election for governor as a member of the Alaskan Independence Party, with Jack Coghill as his running mate. This was the only time since Alaska joined the union that a third-party candidate has been elected governor, until the election of Jesse Ventura in Minnesota in 1998, and then Bill Walker in Alaska in 2014. Hickel refused a vote on secession called on by a fringe group within the AKIP loyal to Vogler's original vision. He rejoined the Republican Party in 1994, with eight months remaining in his term.

Carl E. Moses, a businessman from Unalaska who had served in the Alaska House of Representatives from 1965–1973 as both a Republican and Democrat, was elected again to the House in 1992, running under the AKIP banner. He was elected to a district comprising mostly the area between the Aleutian Islands and Bristol Bay. He switched his party affiliation back to Democrat at around the same time that Hickel switched, and continued to serve in the House until 2007.

The party did not get involved in presidential elections until 1992, when it endorsed Howard Phillips, the candidate of the U.S. Taxpayers Party (now the Constitution Party).

The Alaskan Independence Party sued the state of Alaska in 2020, seeking to overturn the results from a referendum where ranked-choice voting was implemented in Alaska's general elections.

Registered members
In May 2009 the party had 13,119 registered members. As of May 2021, a press release on the AKIP website indicates that the number of 
registered members has grown to nearly 19,000, making it the state's third largest party and about a quarter the size of the state's Democratic party (Republicans had 124,892 members and the Democrats had 75,047).

On September 2, 2008, the Alaska Division of Elections had records that Todd Palin, husband of Governor Sarah Palin (a Republican and vice-presidential candidate), had registered in 1995 as a member of the Alaskan Independence Party. He remained registered with the party until 2002. David Niewert and Max Blumenthal wrote in Salon about the third party's influence in gaining election of Sarah Palin as mayor of Wasilla in her first political office.

2006 ballot initiative
In 2006, members of the AKIP collected the one hundred signatures needed to place on the fall ballot an initiative calling for Alaska to secede from the union or, if that was found not to be legally possible, directing the state to work to make secession legal. However, in the case of Kohlhaas v. State the Alaska State Supreme Court ruled any attempt at secession to be unconstitutional and the initiative was not approved to appear on the fall ballot.

Electoral history

Presidential elections

U.S. Senate elections

U.S. House elections

Gubernatorial elections

Notable party officials

 Bob Bird, currently "Vice Chairman South"
Notable past party officials include:
 Todd Palin, ex-husband of Sarah Palin (was a member for seven years, later switched to Republican Party)
 Edgar Paul Boyko, Attorney General for the State of Alaska
 Paul Chizmar (Fairbanks North Star Borough Assemblymember, 1981–1996)
 Jack Coghill, former Lieutenant Governor of Alaska
 Doyle Holmes (Matanuska-Susitna Borough Assemblymember and perennial candidate for legislative office)
 Bob Logan (former University of Alaska Fairbanks professor and Fairbanks North Star Borough Assemblymember)
 Joe Vogler, founder of the Alaskan Independence Party
 Doug Welton (lieutenant governor nominee 2006)
 Wally Hickel, governor 1966–1969 as a Republican and 1990–1994 as AKIP, the only successful Alaskan Independence gubernatorial candidate to date.
 Dr Christopher Bowkett (who later became a UKIP Candidate for the Telford and Wrekin Council)

See also
 Secession in the United States
 Legal status of Alaska
 List of political parties in the United States
 Political party strength in Alaska
 Puerto Rican Independence Party
 Republic of Texas (group)
 Free State Project
 Hawaiian sovereignty movement
 Second Vermont Republic
 Proposals for new Canadian provinces and territories

References

External links
 Official website

1973 establishments in Alaska
Former Constitution Party (United States) state affiliates
Pro-independence parties
Libertarian parties in the United States
Paleoconservative parties in the United States
Political parties established in 1973
Political parties in Alaska
Secessionist organizations in the United States
Social conservative parties
State and local conservative parties in the United States
Regional and state political parties in the United States